The 2017 Hisense 4K TV 300 was the 10th stock car race of the 2017 NASCAR Xfinity Series season and the 36th iteration of the event. The race was held on Saturday, May 27, 2017, in Concord, North Carolina at Charlotte Motor Speedway, a 1.5 miles (2.4 km) permanent quad-oval. The race took the scheduled 200 laps to complete. At race's end, Ryan Blaney, driving for Team Penske, would climb his way to the lead on the final restart with three to go to win his fifth career NASCAR Xfinity Series win and his first win of the season. To fill out the podium, Kevin Harvick of Stewart-Haas Racing and Austin Dillon of Richard Childress Racing would finish second and third, respectively.

Background 

The race was held at Charlotte Motor Speedway, located in Concord, North Carolina. The speedway complex includes a 1.5-mile (2.4 km) quad-oval track that was utilized for the race, as well as a dragstrip and a dirt track. The speedway was built in 1959 by Bruton Smith and is considered the home track for NASCAR with many race teams based in the Charlotte metropolitan area. The track is owned and operated by Speedway Motorsports Inc. (SMI) with Marcus G. Smith serving as track president.

Entry list 

 (R) denotes rookie driver.
 (i) denotes driver who is ineligible for series driver points.

Practice

First practice 
The first practice session was held on Friday, May 26, at 4:00 PM EST, and would last for 55 minutes.

Second and final practice 
The second and final practice session, sometimes referred to as Happy Hour, was held on Friday, May 26, at 6:00 PM EST, and would last for 55 minutes.

Qualifying 
Qualifying was held on Saturday, May 27, at 10:05 AM EST. Since Charlotte Motor Speedway is under  in length, the qualifying system was a multi-car system that included three rounds. The first round was 15 minutes, where every driver would be able to set a lap within the 15 minutes. Then, the second round would consist of the fastest 24 cars in Round 1, and drivers would have 10 minutes to set a lap. Round 3 consisted of the fastest 12 drivers from Round 2, and the drivers would have 5 minutes to set a time. Whoever was fastest in Round 3 would win the pole.

Two drivers would fail to qualify: Jeff Green and Jordan Anderson.

Full qualifying results

Race results 
Stage 1 Laps: 45

Stage 2 Laps: 45

Stage 3 Laps: 110

Standings after the race 

Drivers' Championship standings

Note: Only the first 12 positions are included for the driver standings.

References 

2017 NASCAR Xfinity Series
NASCAR races at Charlotte Motor Speedway
May 2017 sports events in the United States
2017 in sports in North Carolina